The women's field hockey at the 2010 Asian Games was held in Guangzhou from 13 November to 24 November 2010 at the Aoti Hockey Field.

China won the tournament for the third time after defeating South Korea 5–4 in a penalty shoot-out after the final finished as a 0–0 draw.

Officials
The following umpires were appointed by the FIH and AHF to officiate the tournament:

 Mercedes Sánchez (ARG)
 Chen Hong (CHN)
 Miao Lin (CHN)
 Christiane Hippler (GER)
 Kitty Yau (HKG)
 Anupama Puchimanda (IND)
 Nor Piza Hassan (MAS)
 Miskarmalia Mohd Ariffin (SGP)
 Lynn Hassan (SGP)
 Lesley Nunn (RSA)
 Kang Hyun-young (KOR)

Squads

Ma Yibo
Huang Xuejiao
Ma Wei
Sun Sinan
Fu Baorong
Li Shuang
Gao Lihua
Wang Zhishuang
Zhang Yimeng
Li Hongxia
Ren Ye
Zhao Yudiao
Song Qingling
De Jiaojiao
Xu Xiaoxu
Li Dongxiao

Dipika Murthy
Binita Toppo
Chanchan Devi Thokchom
Surinder Kaur
Poonam Rani
Yogita Bali
Ritu Rani
Deepika Thakur
Jasjeet Kaur Handa
Mukta Prava Barla
Rosalind Ralte
Saba Anjum Karim
Joydeep Kaur
Kirandeep Kaur
Rani Rampal
Subhadra Pradhan

Sakiyo Asano
Keiko Miura
Akemi Kato
Ai Murakami
Miyuki Nakagawa
Keiko Manabe
Yukari Yamamoto
Mie Nakashima
Rika Komazawa
Kaori Chiba
Nagisa Hayashi
Mazuki Arai
Kana Nagayama
Mayumi Ono
Aki Mitsuhashi
Shiho Otsuka

Alessya Pyotukh
Viktoriya Shaimardanova
Natalya Sazontova
Olga Zhizhina
Anastassiya Chsherbakova
Aigerim Makhanova
Yelena Svirskaya
Vera Domashneva
Gulnara Imangaliyeva
Yuliya Mikheichik
Alissa Chepkassova
Irina Dobrioglo
Natalya Gataulina
Mariya Tussubzhanova
Galiya Baissarina
Aliya Mukhambetova

Farah Ayuni Yahya
Fazilla Sylvester Silin
Sebah Kari
Noor Hasliza
Rabiatul Adawiyah
Siti Noor Amarina Ruhaini
Juliani Mohd Din
Norfaraha Hashim
Catherine Lambor
Norhasikin Halim
Norazlin Sumantri
Nuraini Abdul Rashid
Nadia Abdul Rahman
Norbaini Hashim
Siti Noor Hafiza Zainordin
Nor Hidayah Ahmad Bokhari

Moon Young-hui
Kim Young-ran
Kim Bo-mi
Park Seon-mi
Lee Seon-ok
Kim Jong-hee
Park Mi-hyun
Kim Jong-eun
Kim Da-rae
Cheon Seul-ki
Jeon Yu-mi
Gim Sung-hee
Jang Soo-ji
Kim Ok-ju
Kim Eun-sil
Park Ki-ju

Jesdaporn Tongsun
Thanittha Chuangmanichot
Theeranan Taengnim
Benchamas Yuenyong
Tikhamporn Sakunpithak
Kannika Lewrungrot
Phannipha Phanin
Supannee Yimnual
Sukanya Ritngam
Boonta Duangurai
Ratanaporn Shongpranam
Sairung Juwong
Ratsamee Jaturonratsamee
Baifurn Chaisokchuek
Kamolrat Thongkanarak
Duangrut Chantaruck

Results
All times are China Standard Time (UTC+08:00).

Preliminary round

Pool matches

Classification round

Fifth and sixth place

Bronze-medal match

Gold-medal match

Statistics

Final standings

Goalscorers

References

Results

External links
Official website

2014
Women
Asian Games
2010 Asian Games
Asian Games
2010